Ischyroplectron is a monotypic genus of wētā containing the species Ischyroplectron isolatum. I isolatum or the Bounty Island wētā, is a cave wētā in the family Rhaphidophoridae, endemic to Bounty Island of New Zealand.  It is found under rocks.

References 

 Royal Society of New Zealand 
 Peripatus
 TerraNature

Ensifera genera
Monotypic insect genera
Cave weta